Oak Lake may refer to:

Oak Lake, Manitoba, a small town in Manitoba, Canada
Oak Lake Beach, a community in Manitoba
Oak Lake (Manitoba), a lake in Manitoba
Oak Lake, Minnesota, United States, a former town
Oak Lake, a lake in Carver County, Minnesota
Oak Lake, a lake in Lincoln County, Minnesota
Oak Lake (Polk County, Minnesota) 
Oak Lake (Nova Scotia), the name of various lakes in Nova Scotia
Oak Lake (South Dakota)
Oak Lake Indian Reserve, a reserve in Manitoba